Ophichthus serpentinus, known commonly as the slender snake-eel in South Africa, is an eel in the family Ophichthidae (worm/snake eels). It was described by Alvin Seale in 1917. It is a marine, subtropical eel which is known from the southeastern Atlantic Ocean, including Namibia and South Africa.

References

Fish described in 1917
Taxa named by Alvin Seale
serpentinus